Tan Zhuo (born 25 September 1983) is a Chinese television and film actress. She appeared in the films Spring Fever (2009, banned in China), Dying to Survive (2018, one of the highest-grossing films in China) and the 2018 TV series Story of Yanxi Palace.

Filmography

Film

Television series

References

External links
 
 
 
 Tan Zhuo at hkmdb.com
 Tan Zhuo at chinesemov.com

Chinese film actresses
Chinese television actresses
21st-century Chinese actresses
Actresses from Changchun
1983 births
Living people